Pieter Louw (born 24 January 1985) is a South African rugby union footballer. His usual position was flank.

Louw played junior rugby at Boland, later moving to Western Province to play Currie Cup for Cape Town side. He played Super Rugby for Stormers. He also featured in the WP game against British and Irish Lions in 2009. He spent the most time at top level as a cover player for Schalk Burger and later for Francois Louw.

Pieter Louw finished his playing career in 2011 at the age of 26 after three seasons of Super Rugby, then pursuing a business career. He was invited back to Stormers in 2012 while they had many injuries in the back-row, but he turned down the offer, so they loaned Canadian player Jebb Sinclair.

External links
WP rugby profile
Stormers profile

1985 births
Living people
South African rugby union players
Rugby union flankers
Afrikaner people
South African people of Dutch descent
Western Province (rugby union) players
Stormers players
Rugby union players from Cape Town